Compsolechia trochilea is a moth of the family Gelechiidae. It was described by Walsingham in 1910. It is found in Mexico (Tabasco).

The forewings are dark brownish fuscous, with a broad outwardly curved blue-green metallic band near the base, a slightly oblique stone-grey fascia across the middle, somewhat produced inwards on the dorsum, a triangular costal spot of the same colour between this and the metallic band, the termen, apex and cilia also stone-grey. The hindwings are brownish fuscous, with a dark fuscous spot at the flexus.

References

Moths described in 1910
Compsolechia